John Tarleton (ca. 1808 – 1895) was an American settler and rancher. He is best known for endowing John Tarleton Agricultural College, which eventually became Tarleton State University.

Biography 
He was born in either White Mountain, Vermont, or in New Hampshire, probably in November 1808, although one source claims 1811. He was orphaned when he was seven, and went to live with his widowed aunt in Vermont. His brother was sent to another relative in Virginia.

When Tarleton was 13, he left and wandered from place to place all over the country. In Knoxville, Tennessee, he worked as a schoolteacher for a while, before getting a job as a store clerk with the Cowan-Dickerson mercantile. Here he toiled for the next 40 years, living frugally and buying up bounty certificates issued to veterans of the War of 1812, which authorized them "to settle on any unsurveyed or unappropriated public land." He also purchased  of land in Erath and Palo Pinto Counties in Texas at 12.5 cents an acre.

In 1860 or 1861, he set out to look over his property. He found Native Americans living on the land, so he set up a mercantile store in Waco.

In September 1876, he married wealthy widow Mary Louisa Johnson. They agreed to a contract keeping their estates separate, but when the wife learned that her husband owned a considerable amount of land, she asked for a different division of their property. He refused, and a year and a day after their wedding, she filed for divorce in a St. Louis court. John Tarleton got to the hearings just in time to present his copy of their marriage contract, and the divorce was granted with no division of property. The couple did however remain friends.

In 1880, he revisited his land in Erath and Palo Pinto Counties. The Native Americans had been supplanted by settlers, whom he paid for the improvements they had made. He had his land surveyed and tried to sell plots, with no success, so he became a rancher, with middling success.

John Tarleton died of typhoid fever on September 11 or November 16, 1895.

Legacy 
In his will, Tarleton left about $85,000, a considerable amount at the time, to establish a college in Stephenville, Texas, which eventually became Tarleton State University. He also directed that his land in Knoxville be used to set up the John Tarleton Institute "for poor, worthy youths of good moral character." A monument and historical marker to Tarleton stands across from the Stephenville campus at the intersection of Lillian and Washington Streets. A statue honoring Tarleton was erected on the campus in 2015. The original John Tarleton Ranch House is displayed at the Stephenville Historical House Museum.

References

1808 births
1895 deaths
Tarleton State University